MacDonald Spur is a long, low ridge extending eastward from Ballance Peak in the Allan Hills of Oates Land in Antarctica. It was reconnoitered by the New Zealand Antarctic Research Program Allan Hills Expedition (1964), and named for Ivan MacDonald, a field assistant with the expedition.

References

Ridges of Oates Land